Lover, Beloved: Songs from an Evening with Carson McCullers is the ninth studio album by the American singer/songwriter Suzanne Vega, which was released on October 14, 2016. The album is based on the 2011 play Carson McCullers Talks About Love about the life of the writer Carson McCullers, written and performed by Vega.

Background 
When she was 15, Vega read the books of Carson McCullers and has been fascinated by her ever since.

She wrote eight songs with Duncan Sheik and two with Michael Jefry Stevens. Some writing was done in the Metropolitan Museum of Art.

Track listing

Music video 
Official music video for a song "We of Me" has been directed by Chuck Moore.

Personnel
 Suzanne Vega – vocals, composer
 Duncan Sheik – composer, Hammond B3, harmonium, pedal bass, percussion, background vocals
 Gerry Leonard – arranger, guitar, mandolin, producer, ukulele, vibraphone
 Roswell Rudd – trombone
 David Rothenberg – clarinet, bass clarinet
 Michael J. Merenda Jr. – banjo, banjo-ukelele
 Jason Hart – piano
 Will Holshouser – accordion
 Byron Isaacs – double bass
 Yuvall Lyon – drums
 Doug Yowell – percussion
 David Poe – background vocals
 Ruby Froom – background vocals
 The Garrison Gang – background vocals
 Kevin Killen – mixing
 Bob Ludwig – mastering
 Michael Tudor – engineer
 Milo Decruz – engineer

Charts

References

External links
 "Suzanne Vega on Lover, Beloved: Songs From An Evening With Carson McCullers" (video interview of Suzanne Vega and Duncan Sheik)
 "Reflection in a Distant Mirror: Themes from Carson McCullers' The Heart Is a Lonely Hunter in the music of Suzanne Vega" (essay)

2016 albums
Suzanne Vega albums